Bilal Hussein Hajo (born 1 February 1980) is a Lebanese football coach and former player who is the assistant coach of  club Tadamon Sour. As a player, he played as a defensive midfielder.

Club career 
Hajo began his senior career with Tadamon Sour, coming through their youth sector. He helped them win the Lebanese FA Cup in 2000–01, and the Lebanese Premier League the same year (however, the Lebanese Football Association revoked the title from Tadamon). He also played for Mabarra, before returning to Tadamon.

In May 2022, Hajo decided to retire from football. He stated his intention to become head coach of a club in the near future.

Managerial career 
On 28 June 2022, Hajo was appointed assistant coach of Tadamon Sour, for whom he had already played at club level.

Personal life 
Hajo has two sons.

Honours 
Tadamon Sour
 Lebanese FA Cup: 2000–01
 Lebanese Challenge Cup: 2013, 2018; runner-up: 2017
 Lebanese Second Division: 2015–16

Mabarra
 Lebanese FA Cup: 2007–08; runner-up: 2009–10
 Lebanese Super Cup runner-up: 2008

References

External links

 
 
 
 

1980 births
Living people
People from Tyre, Lebanon
Lebanese footballers
Association football midfielders
Tadamon Sour SC players
Al Mabarra Club players
Lebanese Premier League players
Lebanese Second Division players
Lebanon international footballers
Lebanese football managers
Association football coaches